Kolpakovo is a rural locality (a village) in Slednevskoye Rural Settlement, Alexandrovsky District, Vladimir Oblast, Russia. The population was 9 as of 2010. There are 2 streets.

Geography 
Kolpakovo is located 8 km northwest of Alexandrov (the district's administrative centre) by road. Monastyrevo is the nearest rural locality.

References 

Rural localities in Alexandrovsky District, Vladimir Oblast